Sleep deprivation, also known as sleep insufficiency or sleeplessness, is the condition of not having adequate duration and/or quality of sleep to support decent alertness, performance, and health. It can be either chronic or acute and may vary widely in severity.

Acute sleep deprivation is when an individual sleeps less than usual or does not sleep at all for a short period of time – usually lasting one to two days. Chronic sleep deprivation means when an individual routinely sleeps less than an optimal amount for ideal functioning. Chronic sleep deficiency is often confused with the term insomnia. Although both chronic sleep deficiency and insomnia share decreased quantity and/or quality of sleep as well as impaired function, their difference lies in the ability to fall asleep. Sleep deprived individuals are able to fall asleep rapidly when allowed but those with insomnia have difficulty falling asleep.

The average adult needs seven or more hours of sleep per night to maintain health. The amount of sleep needed can depend on sleep quality, age, pregnancy, and level of sleep deprivation. Insufficient sleep has been linked to weight gain, high blood pressure, diabetes, depression, heart disease, and strokes. Sleep deprivation can also lead to high anxiety, irritability, erratic behavior, poor cognitive functioning and performance, and psychotic episodes.

A chronic sleep-restricted state adversely affects the brain and cognitive function. However, in a subset of cases, sleep deprivation can paradoxically lead to increased energy and alertness and enhanced mood; although its long-term consequences have never been evaluated, sleep deprivation has even been used as a treatment for depression.

Few studies have compared the effects of acute total sleep deprivation and chronic partial sleep restriction. A complete absence of sleep over a long period is not frequent in humans (unless they have fatal insomnia or specific issues caused by surgery); it appears that brief microsleeps cannot be avoided. Long-term total sleep deprivation has caused death in lab animals.

Causes

Insomnia

Insomnia, one of the six types of dyssomnia, affects 21–37% of the adult population. Many of its symptoms are easily recognizable, including excessive daytime sleepiness; frustration or worry about sleep; problems with attention, concentration, or memory; extreme mood changes or irritability; lack of energy or motivation; poor performance at school or work; and tension headaches or stomach aches.

Insomnia can be grouped into primary and secondary, or comorbid, insomnia.

Primary insomnia is a sleep disorder not attributable to a medical, psychiatric, or environmental cause. There are three main types of primary insomnia. These include: psychophysiological, idiopathic insomnia, and sleep state misperception (paradoxical insomnia). Psychophysiological insomnia is anxiety-induced. Idiopathic insomnia generally begins in childhood and lasts the rest of a person's life. It's suggested that idiopathic insomnia is a neurochemical problem in a part of the brain that controls the sleep-wake cycle, resulting in either under-active sleep signals or over-active wake signals. Sleep state misperception is diagnosed when people get enough sleep but inaccurately perceive that their sleep is insufficient.

Secondary insomnia, or comorbid insomnia, occurs concurrently with other medical, neurological, psychological and psychiatric conditions. Causation is not necessarily implied.

Sleep deprivation is known to be cumulative. This means that the fatigue and sleep one lost as a result, for example, staying awake all night, would be carried over to the following day. Not getting enough sleep for a couple of days cumulatively builds up a deficiency and causes symptoms of sleep deprivation to appear. A well rested and healthy individual will generally spend less time in the REM stage of sleep. Studies have shown an inverse relationship between time spent in the REM stage of sleep and subsequent wakefulness during waking hours.

Sleep apnea

Sleep apnea is a serious disorder that has symptoms of both insomnia and sleep deprivation, among other symptoms like excessive daytime sleepiness, abrupt awakenings, and difficulty concentrating. Obstructive sleep apnea is often caused by collapse of the upper airway during sleep, which reduces airflow to the lungs. Those with sleep apnea may experience symptoms such as awakening gasping or choking, restless sleep, morning headaches, morning confusion or irritability and restlessness. This disorder affects 1 to 10 percent of Americans. It has many serious health outcomes if untreated. Positive airway pressure therapy using a CPAP (continuous positive airway pressure), APAP or BPAP devices is considered to be the first line treatment option for sleep apnea. Mandibular displacement devices in some cases can reposition the jaw and tongue to prevent the airway from collapsing. For some patients supplemental oxygen therapy may be indicated. Nasal problems such as a deviated septum will shut down the airway and increase swelling in the mucus lining and nasal turbinates. Corrective surgery (septoplasty) in some cases may be an appropriate choice of treatment.

Central sleep apnea is caused by a failure of the central nervous system to signal the body to breathe during sleep. Treatments similar to obstructive sleep apnea may be used as well as other treatments such as Adaptive Servo Ventilation and certain medications. Some medications such as opioids may contribute to or cause central sleep apnea.

Voluntary
Sleep deprivation can sometimes be self-imposed due to a lack of desire to sleep or the habitual use of stimulant drugs. Sleep deprivation is also self-imposed to achieve personal fame in the context of record-breaking stunts.

Mental illness
The specific causal relationships between sleep loss and effects on psychiatric disorders have been most extensively studied in patients with mood disorders. Shifts into mania in bipolar patients are often preceded by periods of insomnia, and sleep deprivation has been shown to induce a manic state in about 30% of patients. Sleep deprivation may represent a final common pathway in the genesis of mania, and manic patients usually have a continuous reduced need for sleep.

Chronic sleep problems affect 50% to 80% of patients in a typical psychiatric practice, compared with 10% to 18% of adults in the general U.S. population. Sleep problems are particularly common in patients with anxiety, depression, bipolar disorder, and attention deficit hyperactivity disorder (ADHD).

The symptoms of sleep deprivation and those of schizophrenia are paralleled, including those of positive and cognitive symptoms.

School

The US National Sleep Foundation cites a 1996 paper showing that college/university-aged students got an average of less than 6 hours of sleep each night. A 2018 study highlights the need for a good night's sleep for students finding that college students who averaged eight hours of sleep for the five nights of finals week scored higher on their final exams than those who didn't.

In the study, 70.6% of students reported obtaining less than 8 hours of sleep, and up to 27% of students may be at risk for at least one sleep disorder. Sleep deprivation is common in first year college students as they adjust to the stress and social activities of college life.

Estevan, et al, studied the relationships between sleep and test performance. They found that students tend to sleep less than usual the night before an exam, and that exam performance was positively correlated with sleep duration.

A study performed by the Department of Psychology at the National Chung Cheng University in Taiwan concluded that freshmen received the least amount of sleep during the week.

Studies of later start times in schools have consistently reported benefits to adolescent sleep, health and learning using a wide variety of methodological approaches. In contrast, there are no studies showing that early start times have any positive impact on sleep, health or learning. Data from international studies demonstrate that "synchronised" start times for adolescents are far later than the start times in the overwhelming majority of educational institutions. In 1997, University of Minnesota research compared students who started school at 7:15 am with those who started at 8:40 am. They found that students who started at 8:40 got higher grades and more sleep on weekday nights than those who started earlier. One in four U.S. high school students admits to falling asleep in class at least once a week.

It is known that during human adolescence, circadian rhythms and therefore sleep patterns typically undergo marked changes. Electroencephalogram (EEG) studies indicate a 50% reduction of deep (stage 4) sleep and a 75% reduction in the peak amplitude of delta waves during NREM sleep in adolescence. School schedules are often incompatible with a corresponding delay in sleep offset, leading to a less than optimal amount of sleep for the majority of adolescents.

Caffeine 
Consumption of caffeine in large quantities can have negative effects on one's sleep cycle.
While there are short-term performance benefits to caffeine consumption, overuse can lead to insomnia symptoms or worsen pre-existing insomnia. Consuming caffeine to stay awake at night may lead to sleeplessness, anxiety, frequent nighttime awakenings, and overall poorer sleep quality.

Hospital stay 
A study performed nationwide in the Netherlands found that general ward patients staying at the hospital experienced shorter total sleep (83 min. less), more night-time awakenings, and earlier awakenings compared to sleeping at home. Over 70% experienced being woken up by external causes, such as hospital staff (35.8%). Sleep disturbing factors included noise of other patients, medical devices, pain, and toilet visits.  Sleep deprivation is even more severe in ICU patients, where the naturally occurring nocturnal peak of melatonin secretion was found to be absent, possibly causing the disruption in the normal sleep-wake cycle. However, as the personal characteristics and the clinical picture of hospital patients are so diverse, the possible solutions to improve sleep and circadian rhythmicity should be tailored to the individual and within the possibilities of the hospital ward. Multiple interventions could be considered to aid patient characteristics, improve hospital routines, or the hospital environment.

Internet 
A study published in the Journal of Economic Behavior and Organisation found out that broadband internet connection was associated with sleep deprivation. The study concluded that the people with a broadband connection tend to sleep 25 minutes less than those without the broadband connection, hence they are less likely to get the scientifically recommended 7–9 hours of sleep. Another study conducted on 435 non-medical staff at King Saud University Medical City reported that 9 out of 10 of the respondents used their smartphones at bedtime, with social media being the most used service (80.5%). The study found participants who spent more than 60 minutes using their smartphones at bedtime were 7.4 times more likely to have poor sleep quality than participants who spent less than 15 minutes.

Effects and consequences

Brain

Temporary 
One study suggested, based on neuroimaging, that 35 hours of total sleep deprivation in healthy controls negatively affected the brain's ability to put an emotional event into the proper perspective and make a controlled, suitable response to the event.

The negative effects of sleep deprivation on alertness and cognitive performance suggest decreases in brain activity and function. These changes primarily occur in two regions: the thalamus, a structure involved in alertness and attention; and the prefrontal cortex, a region sub-serving alertness, attention, and higher-order cognitive processes. This was the finding of an American study in 2000. Seventeen men in their 20s were tested. Sleep deprivation was progressive with measurements of glucose (absolute regional CMRglu), cognitive performance, alertness, mood, and subjective experiences collected after 0, 24, 48, and 72 hours of sleep deprivation. Additional measures of alertness, cognitive performance, and mood were collected at fixed intervals. PET scans were used and attention was paid to the circadian rhythm of cognitive performance. Interestingly, the effects of sleep deprivation appear to be constant across "night owls" and "early birds", or different sleep chronotypes, as revealed by fMRI and graph theory.

A noted 2002 University of California animal study indicated that non-rapid eye movement sleep (NREM) is necessary for turning off neurotransmitters and allowing their receptors to "rest" and regain sensitivity which allows monoamines (norepinephrine, serotonin and histamine) to be effective at naturally produced levels. This leads to improved regulation of mood and increased learning ability. The study also found that rapid eye movement sleep (REM) deprivation may alleviate clinical depression because it mimics selective serotonin reuptake inhibitors (SSRIs). This is because the natural decrease in monoamines during REM is not allowed to occur, which causes the concentration of neurotransmitters in the brain, that are depleted in clinically depressed persons, to increase.

Lasting 

Studies on rodents show that response to neuronal injury due to acute sleep deprivationand is adaptative before 3 hours of sleep loss per night and becomes maladaptative and apoptosis occurs after. Studies in mices shows neuronal deaths (in the hyppocampus, locus coeruleus and medial PFC) occur after 2 days of REM sleep deprivation. However, mices does not model well effects in humans because they sleep a third of the duration of REM sleep of humans and caspase-3,  the main effector of apoptosis, kills 3 times the amount of cells in humans than in mices. Also not accounted in nearly all of the studies is that acute REM sleep deprivation induces lasting (> 20 days) neuronal apoptosis in mice, and apoptosis rate increases on the day following its end, so the amount of apoptosis is often undercounted in mice because experiments nearly always measure it the day the sleep deprivation ends.  For theses reasons, both the time before cells degenerate and the extent of degeneration could be greatly underevaluated in humans.

Such histological studies cannot be performed on humans for ethical reasons, but long term studies study shows that sleep quality is more associated to grey matter volume reduction than age, occuring in areas like the precuneus.

Sleep is necessary to repair cellular damage, such as caused by reactive oxygen species and DNA damages. During long (both accute and long term) sleep deprivation, cellular dammage aggregates up to a tipping point that causes them to degenerate and apoptose.
REM sleep deprivation causes an increase in noradrenaline (which incidentaly causes the person sleep deprived to be stressed) due to the neurons in the locus coeruleus producing it not cessing to do so, which causes an increase in the activity of the Na⁺/K⁺-ATPase pump, which itself activates the intrisic pathway of apoptosis and prevents autophagy, which also induces the mitochondrial pathway of apoptosis.

Sleep outside of the REM phase may allow enzymes to repair brain cell damage caused by free radicals. High metabolic activity while awake damages the enzymes themselves preventing efficient repair. This study observed the first evidence of brain damage in rats as a direct result of sleep deprivation.

Attention and working memory
Among the possible physical consequences of sleep deprivation, deficits in attention and working memory are perhaps the most important; such lapses in mundane routines can lead to unfortunate results, from forgetting ingredients while cooking to missing a sentence while taking notes. Performing tasks that require attention appears to be correlated with number of hours of sleep received each night, declining as a function of hours of sleep deprivation. Working memory is tested by methods such as choice-reaction time tasks.

The attentional lapses also extend into more critical domains in which the consequences can be life-or-death; car crashes and industrial disasters can result from inattentiveness attributable to sleep deprivation. To empirically measure the magnitude of attention deficits, researchers typically employ the psychomotor vigilance task (PVT) which requires the subject to press a button in response to a light at random intervals. Failure to press the button in response to the stimulus (light) is recorded as an error, attributable to the microsleeps that occur as a product of sleep deprivation.

Crucially, individuals' subjective evaluations of their fatigue often do not predict actual performance on the PVT. While totally sleep-deprived individuals are usually aware of the degree of their impairment, lapses from chronic (lesser) sleep deprivation can build up over time so that they are equal in number and severity to the lapses occurring from total (acute) sleep deprivation. Chronically sleep-deprived people, however, continue to rate themselves considerably less impaired than totally sleep-deprived participants. Since people usually evaluate their capability on tasks like driving subjectively, their evaluations may lead them to the false conclusion that they can perform tasks that require constant attention when their abilities are in fact impaired.

Mood 
Sleep deprivation can have a negative impact on mood. Staying up all night or taking an unexpected night shift can make one feel irritable. Once one catches up on sleep, one's mood will often return to baseline or normal. Even partial sleep deprivation can have a significant impact on mood. In one study, subjects reported increased sleepiness, fatigue, confusion, tension, and total mood disturbance, which all recovered to their baseline after one to two full nights of sleep.

Depression and sleep are in a bidirectional relationship. Poor sleep can lead to development of depression and depression can cause insomnia, hypersomnia, or obstructive sleep apnea. About 75% of adult patients with depression can present insomnia. Sleep deprivation, whether total or not, can induce significant anxiety and longer sleep deprivations tend to result in increased level of anxiety.

Sleep deprivation has also shown some positive effects on mood, and can be used to treat depression. Chronotype can affect how sleep deprivation influences mood. Those with morningness (advanced sleep period or "lark") preference become more depressed after sleep deprivation while those with eveningness (delayed sleep period or "owl") preference show an improvement in mood.

Mood and mental states can affect sleep as well. Increased agitation and arousal from anxiety or stress can keep one more aroused, awake, and alert.

Driving ability

The dangers of sleep deprivation are apparent on the road; the American Academy of Sleep Medicine (AASM) reports that one in every five serious motor vehicle injuries is related to driver fatigue, with 80,000 drivers falling asleep behind the wheel every day and 250,000 accidents every year related to sleep, though the National Highway Traffic Safety Administration suggests the figure for traffic accidents may be closer to 100,000. The AASM recommends pulling off the road and taking a 15- or 20-minute nap to alleviate drowsiness.

According to a 2000 study published in the British Medical Journal, researchers in Australia and New Zealand reported that sleep deprivation can have some of the same hazardous effects as being drunk. People who drove after being awake for 17–19 hours performed worse than those with a blood alcohol level of 0.05 percent, which is the legal limit for drunk driving in most western European countries and Australia. Another study suggested that performance begins to degrade after 16 hours awake, and 21 hours awake was equivalent to a blood alcohol content of 0.08 percent, which is the blood alcohol limit for drunk driving in Canada, the U.S., and the U.K.

Fatigue of drivers of goods trucks and passenger vehicles have come to the attention of authorities in many countries, where specific laws have been introduced with the aim of reducing the risk of traffic accidents due to driver fatigue. Rules concerning minimum break lengths, maximum shift lengths and minimum time between shifts are common in the driving regulations used in different countries and regions, such as the drivers' working hours regulations in the European Union and hours of service regulations in the United States.

The Exxon Valdez Oil Spill was the second largest oil spill in the United States. This accident occurred when an Exxon oil tanker struck a reef at the Prince William Sound in Alaska. Approximately 10.8 million gallons of oil spilled into the sea. The accident caused great environmental damage including the death of hundreds of thousands of birds and sea creatures. Fatigue and sleep deprivation were the major contributors to the accident. The captain of the ship was asleep after a night of heavy drinking; he was severely fatigued and had been awake for 18 hours. The entire crew was suffering from fatigue and inadequate sleep.

Sleep transition
Sleep propensity (SP) can be defined as the readiness to transit from wakefulness to sleep, or the ability to stay asleep if already sleeping. Sleep deprivation increases this propensity, which can be measured by polysomnography (PSG), as a reduction in sleep latency (the time needed to fall asleep). An indicator of sleep propensity can also be seen in the shortening of transition from light stages of non-REM sleep to deeper slow-waves oscillations can also be measured as indicator of sleep propensity.

On average, the latency in healthy adults decreases by a few minutes after a night without sleep, and the latency from sleep onset to slow-wave sleep is halved. Sleep latency is generally measured with the multiple sleep latency test (MSLT). In contrast, the maintenance of wakefulness test (MWT) also uses sleep latency, but this time as a measure of the capacity of the participants to stay awake (when asked to) instead of falling asleep.

Sleep-wake cycle
People aged 18 to 64 need seven to nine hours of sleep per night. Research studying sleep deprivation shows its impact on mood, cognitive and motor functioning, due to dysregulation of the sleep-wake cycle and augmented sleep propensity. Multiple studies that identified the role of the hypothalamus and multiple neural systems controlling circadian rhythms and homeostasis have been helpful in understanding sleep deprivation better. To describe the temporal course of the sleep-wake cycle, the two-process model of sleep regulation can be mentioned.

This model proposes a homeostatic process (Process S) and a circadian process (Process C) that interact to define the time and intensity of sleep. Process S represents the drive for sleep, increasing during wakefulness and decreasing during sleep, until a defined threshold level, while Process C is the oscillator responsible for these levels. When being sleep deprived, homeostatic pressure accumulates to the point that waking functions will be degraded even at the highest circadian drive for wakefulness.

Microsleeps
Microsleeps are periods of brief sleep that most frequently occur when a person has a significant level of sleep deprivation. Microsleeps usually last for a few seconds, usually no longer than 15 seconds, and happen most frequently when a person is trying to stay awake when they are feeling sleepy. The person usually falls into microsleep while doing a monotonous task like driving, reading a book, or staring at a computer. Microsleeps are similar to blackouts and a person experiencing them is not consciously aware that they are occurring.

An even lighter type of sleep has been seen in rats that have been kept awake for long periods of time. In a process known as local sleep, specific localized brain regions went into periods of short (~80 ms) but frequent (~40/min) NREM-like states. Despite the on and off periods where neurons shut off, the rats appeared to be awake, although they performed poorly at tests.

Cardiovascular morbidity 
Decreased sleep duration is associated with many adverse cardiovascular consequences. The American Heart Association has stated that sleep restriction is a risk factor for adverse cardiometabolic profiles and outcomes. The organization recommends healthy sleep habits for ideal cardiac health along with other well known factors like blood pressure, cholesterol, diet, glucose, weight, smoking, and physical activity. The Centers for Disease Control and Prevention has noted that adults who sleep less than 7 hours per day are more likely to have chronic health conditions including heart attack, coronary heart disease, and stroke compared to those with adequate amount of sleep.

In a study that followed over 160,000 healthy, non-obese adults, the subjects who self-reported sleep duration less than 6 hours a day were at an increased risk for developing multiple cardiometabolic risk factors. They presented with increased central obesity, elevated fasting glucose, hypertension, low high-density lipoprotein, hypertriglyceridemia, and metabolic syndrome. The presence or lack of insomnia symptoms did not modify the effects of sleep duration in this study.

The United Kingdom Biobank studied nearly 500,000 adults who had no cardiovascular disease, and the subjects who slept less than 6 hours a day were associated with a 20 percent increase in the risk of developing myocardial infarction (MI) over 7 years of follow-up period. Interestingly, long sleep duration of more than 9 hours a night was also a risk factor.

Immunosuppression 
Among the myriad of health consequences that sleep deprivation can cause, disruption of the immune system is one of them. While it is not clearly understood, researchers believe that sleep is essential to providing sufficient energy for the immune system to work and allow inflammation to take place during sleep. Also, just as sleep can reinforce memory in a person's brain, it can help consolidate the memory of the immune system or adaptive immunity.

An adequate amount of sleep improves effects of vaccines that utilize adaptive immunity. When vaccines expose the body to a weakened or deactivated antigen, the body initiates an immune response. The immune system learns to recognize that antigen and attacks it when exposed again in the future. Studies have found that people who don't sleep the night after getting a vaccine were less likely to develop a proper immune response to the vaccine and sometimes even required a second dose. People who are sleep deprived in general also do not provide their bodies with sufficient time for an adequate immunological memory to form, and thus, can fail to benefit from vaccination.

People who sleep less than 6 hours a night are more prone to infection and are more likely to catch a cold or flu. A lack of sleep can also prolong the recovery time in patients in intensive care unit (ICU).

Weight gain 

A lack of sleep can cause an imbalance in several hormones that are critical in weight gain. Sleep deprivation increases the level of ghrelin (hunger hormone) and decreases the level of leptin (fullness hormone), resulting in an increased feeling of hunger and desire for high-calorie foods. Sleep loss is also associated with decreased growth hormone and elevated cortisol levels, which are connected to obesity. People who do not get sufficient sleep can also feel sleepy and fatigued during the day and get less exercise. Obesity can cause poor sleep quality as well. Individuals who are overweight or obese can experience obstructive sleep apnea, gastroesophageal reflux disease (GERD), depression, asthma, and osteoarthritis which all can disrupt a good night's sleep.

In rats, prolonged, complete sleep deprivation increased both food intake and energy expenditure with a net effect of weight loss and ultimately death. This study hypothesizes that the moderate chronic sleep debt associated with habitual short sleep is associated with increased appetite and energy expenditure with the equation tipped towards food intake rather than expenditure in societies where high-calorie food is freely available.

Type 2 diabetes
It has been suggested that people experiencing short-term sleep restrictions process glucose more slowly than individuals receiving a full 8 hours of sleep, increasing the likelihood of developing type 2 diabetes. Poor sleep quality is linked to high blood sugar levels in diabetic and prediabetic patients but the causal relationship is not clearly understood. Researchers suspect that sleep deprivation affects insulin, cortisol, and oxidative stress, which subsequently influence blood sugar levels. Sleep deprivation can increase the level of ghrelin and decrease the level of leptin. People who get insufficient amount of sleep are more likely to crave food in order to compensate for the lack of energy. This habit can raise blood sugar and put them at risk of obesity and diabetes.

In 2005, a study of over 1400 participants showed that participants who habitually slept few hours were more likely to have associations with type 2 diabetes. However, because this study was merely correlational, the direction of cause and effect between little sleep and diabetes is uncertain. The authors point to an earlier study which showed that experimental rather than habitual restriction of sleep resulted in impaired glucose tolerance (IGT).

Other effects

The National Sleep Foundation identifies several warning signs that a driver is dangerously fatigued. These include rolling down the window, turning up the radio, trouble keeping eyes open, head-nodding, drifting out of their lane, and daydreaming. At particular risk are lone drivers between midnight and 6:00 am.

Sleep deprivation can negatively impact overall performance, and has led to major fatal accidents. Due largely to the February 2009 crash of Colgan Air Flight 3407, which killed 50 people and was partially attributed to pilot fatigue, the FAA reviewed its procedures to ensure that pilots are sufficiently rested. Air traffic controllers were under scrutiny when in 2010 there were 10 incidents of controllers falling asleep while on shift.  The common practice of turn-around shifts caused sleep deprivation and was a contributing factor to all air traffic control incidents.  The FAA reviewed its practices of shift changes and the findings saw that controllers were not well rested. A 2004 study also found medical residents with less than four hours of sleep a night made more than twice as many errors as the 11% of surveyed residents who slept for more than seven hours a night.

Twenty-four hours of continuous sleep deprivation results in the choice of less difficult math tasks without decreases in subjective reports of effort applied to the task. Naturally caused sleep loss affects the choice of everyday tasks such that low effort tasks are mostly commonly selected. Adolescents who experience less sleep show a decreased willingness to engage in sports activities that require effort through fine motor coordination and attention to detail.

Great sleep deprivation mimics psychosis: distorted perceptions can lead to inappropriate emotional and behavioral responses.

Astronauts have reported performance errors and decreased cognitive ability during periods of extended working hours and wakefulness as well as due to sleep loss caused by circadian rhythm disruption and environmental factors.

One study has found that a single night of sleep deprivation may cause tachycardia, a condition in which the heartrate exceeds 100 beats per minute (in the following day).

Generally, sleep deprivation may facilitate or intensify:
 aching muscles
confusion, memory lapses or loss
 depression
 development of false memory
 hypnagogic and hypnopompic hallucinations during falling asleep and waking, which are entirely normal
 hand tremor
 headaches
 malaise
 stye
 periorbital puffiness, commonly known as "bags under eyes" or eye bags
 increased blood pressure
 increased stress hormone levels
 increased risk of Type 2 diabetes
 lowering of immunity, increased susceptibility to illness
 increased risk of fibromyalgia
 irritability
 nystagmus (rapid involuntary rhythmic eye movement) 
 obesity
 seizures
 temper tantrums in children
 violent behavior
 yawning
 mania
Sleep inertia
Sleep deprivation may cause symptoms similar to:
 attention-deficit hyperactivity disorder (ADHD)
 psychosis

Assessment 
Patients with sleep deprivation may present with complaints of symptoms and signs of insufficient sleep such as fatigue, sleepiness, drowsy driving, and cognitive difficulties. Sleep insufficiency can easily go unrecognized and undiagnosed unless patients are specifically asked about it by their clinicians.

Several questions are critical in evaluating sleep duration and quality, as well as the cause of sleep deprivation. Sleep patterns (typical bed time or rise time on weekdays and weekends), shift work, and frequency of naps can reveal the direct cause of poor sleep, and quality of sleep should be discussed to rule out any diseases such as obstructive sleep apnea and restless leg syndrome.

Sleep diaries are useful in providing detailed information about sleep patterns. They are inexpensive, readily available, and easy to use. The diaries can be as simple as a 24-hour log to note the time of being asleep or can be detailed to include other relevant information. Sleep questionnaires such as the Sleep Timing Questionnaire (STQ) can be used instead of sleep diaries if there is any concern for patient adherence.

Actigraphy is a useful, objective wrist-worn tool if the validity of self-reported sleep diaries or questionnaires is questionable. Actigraphy works by recording movements and using computerized algorithms to estimate total sleep time, sleep onset latency, the amount of wake after sleep onset, and sleep efficiency. Some devices have light sensors to detect light exposure.

Management

Although there are numerous causes of sleep deprivation, there are some fundamental measures that promote quality sleep as suggested by organizations such as Centers for Disease Control and Prevention, the National Institute of Health, the National Institute of Aging, and the American Academy of Family Physicians. The key is to implement healthier sleep habits, also known as sleep hygiene. Sleep hygiene recommendations include setting a fixed sleep schedule, taking naps with caution, maintaining a sleep environment that promotes sleep (cool temperature, limited exposure to light and noise, comfortable mattress and pillows), exercising daily, avoiding alcohol, cigarettes, caffeine, and heavy meals in the evening, winding down and avoiding electronic use or physical activities close to bedtime, and getting out of bed if unable to fall asleep.

For long term involuntary sleep deprivation, cognitive behavioral therapy for Insomnia (CBT-i) is commonly recommended as a first-line treatment, after exclusion of physical diagnosis (f.e. sleep apnea). CBT-i contains five different components: cognitive therapy, stimulus control, sleep restriction, sleep hygiene, and relaxation. These components together have shown to be effective in adults, with clinical meaningful effect sizes. As this approach has minimal adverse effects, and long-term benefits, it is often preferred to (chronic) drug therapy.

There are several strategies that help increase alertness and counteract the effects of sleep deprivation. Caffeine is often used over short periods to boost wakefulness when acute sleep deprivation is experienced; however, caffeine is less effective if taken routinely. Other strategies recommended by the American Academy of Sleep Medicine include prophylactic sleep before deprivation, naps, other stimulants, and combinations thereof. However, the only sure and safe way to combat sleep deprivation is to increase nightly sleep time.

Uses

To facilitate abusive control
Sleep deprivation can be used to disorientate abuse victims to help set them up for abusive control.

Interrogation
Sleep deprivation can be used as a means of interrogation, which has resulted in court trials over whether or not the technique is a form of torture.

Under one interrogation technique, a subject might be kept awake for several days and when finally allowed to fall asleep, suddenly awakened and questioned. Menachem Begin, the Prime Minister of Israel from 1977 to 1983, described his experience of sleep deprivation as a prisoner of the NKVD in the Soviet Union as follows:

Sleep deprivation was one of the five techniques used by the British government in the 1970s. The European Court of Human Rights ruled that the five techniques "did not occasion suffering of the particular intensity and cruelty implied by the word torture ... [but] amounted to a practice of inhuman and degrading treatment", in breach of the European Convention on Human Rights.

The United States Justice Department released four memos in August 2002 describing interrogation techniques used by the Central Intelligence Agency. They first described 10 techniques used in the interrogation of Abu Zubaydah, described as a terrorist logistics specialist, including sleep deprivation. Memos signed by Steven G. Bradbury in May 2005 claimed that forced sleep deprivation for up to 180 hours ( days) by shackling a diapered prisoner to the ceiling did not constitute torture, nor did the combination of multiple interrogation methods (including sleep deprivation) constitute torture under United States law. These memoranda were repudiated and withdrawn during the first months of the Obama administration.

The question of extreme use of sleep deprivation as torture has advocates on both sides of the issue. In 2006, Australian Federal Attorney-General Philip Ruddock argued that sleep deprivation does not constitute torture. Nicole Bieske, a spokeswoman for Amnesty International Australia, has stated the opinion of her organization thus: "At the very least, sleep deprivation is cruel, inhumane and degrading. If used for prolonged periods of time it is torture."

Treating depression

Studies show that sleep restriction has some potential in treating depression. Those with depression tend to have earlier occurrences of REM sleep with an increased number of rapid eye movements; therefore, monitoring patients' EEG and awakening them during occurrences of REM sleep appear to have a therapeutic effect, alleviating depressive symptoms. This kind of treatment is known as wake therapy. Although as many as 60% of patients show an immediate recovery when sleep-deprived, most patients relapse the following night. The effect has been shown to be linked to an increase in the brain-derived neurotrophic factor (BDNF).  A comprehensive evaluation of the human metabolome in sleep deprivation in 2014 found that 27 metabolites are increased after 24 waking hours and suggested serotonin, tryptophan, and taurine may contribute to the antidepressive effect.

The incidence of relapse can be decreased by combining sleep deprivation with medication or a combination of light therapy and phase advance (going to bed substantially earlier than one's normal time). Many tricyclic antidepressants suppress REM sleep, providing an additional evidence for a link between mood and sleep. Similarly, tranylcypromine has been shown to completely suppress REM sleep at adequate doses.

Treating insomnia 
Sleep deprivation can be implemented for a short period of time in the treatment of insomnia. Some common sleep disorders have been shown to respond to cognitive behavioral therapy for insomnia. Cognitive behavioral therapy for insomnia is a multicomponent process that is composed of stimulus control therapy, sleep restriction therapy (SRT), and sleep hygiene therapy. One of the components is a controlled regime of "sleep restriction" in order to restore the homeostatic drive to sleep and encourage normal "sleep efficiency". Stimulus control therapy is intended to limit behaviors intended to condition the body to sleep while in bed. The main goal of stimulus control and sleep restriction therapy is to create an association between bed and sleep. Although sleep restriction therapy shows efficacy when applied as an element of cognitive-behavioral therapy, its efficacy is yet to be proven when used alone. Sleep Hygiene therapy is intended to help patients develop and maintain good sleeping habits. Sleep hygiene therapy is not helpful however, when used as a monotherapy without the pairing of Stimulus control therapy and Sleep restriction therapy.

In addition to the cognitive behavioral treatment of insomnia there are also generally four approaches to treating insomnia medically. These are through the use of barbiturates, benzodiazepines, and benzodiazepine receptor agonists. Barbiturates are not considered to be a primary source of treatment due to the fact that they have a low therapeutic index, while melatonin agonists are shown to have a higher therapeutic index.

Military training 

Sleep deprivation has been used by the military in training programs to prepare personnel combat experiences when proper sleep schedules aren't realistic. Sleep deprivation is used to create a different time schedule pattern that is beyond a typical 24 hour day. Sleep deprivation is pivotal in training games such as "Keep in Memory" exercises where personnel practice memorizing everything they can while under intense stress physically and mentally and being able to describe in as much detail as they can remember of what they remember seeing days later. Sleep deprivation is used in training to create soldiers who are used to only going off of a few hours or minutes of sleep randomly when available.

Changes in American sleep habits 

National Geographic Magazine has reported that the demands of work, social activities, and the availability of 24-hour home entertainment and Internet access have caused people to sleep less now than in premodern times. USA Today reported in 2007 that most adults in the USA get about an hour less than the average sleep time 40 years ago.

Other researchers have questioned these claims. A 2004 editorial in the journal Sleep stated that according to the available data, the average number of hours of sleep in a 24-hour period has not changed significantly in recent decades among adults. Furthermore, the editorial suggests that there is a range of normal sleep time required by healthy adults, and many indicators used to suggest chronic sleepiness among the population as a whole do not stand up to scientific scrutiny.

A comparison of data collected from the Bureau of Labor Statistics' American Time Use Survey from 1965 to 1985 and 1998–2001 has been used to show that the median amount of sleep, napping, and resting done by the average adult American has changed by less than 0.7%, from a median of 482 minutes per day from 1965 through 1985, to 479 minutes per day from 1998 through 2001.

Longest periods without sleep
Randy Gardner holds the scientifically documented record for the longest period of time a human being has intentionally gone without sleep not using stimulants of any kind. Gardner stayed awake for 264 hours (11 days), breaking the previous record of 260 hours held by Tom Rounds of Honolulu. Lieutenant Commander John J. Ross of the U.S. Navy Medical Neuropsychiatric Research Unit later published an account of this event, which became well known among sleep-deprivation researchers.

The Guinness World Record stands at 449 hours (18 days, 17 hours), held by Maureen Weston, of Peterborough, Cambridgeshire in April 1977, in a rocking-chair marathon.

Claims of total sleep deprivation lasting years have been made several times, but none are scientifically verified. Claims of partial sleep deprivation are better documented. For example, Rhett Lamb of St. Petersburg, Florida was initially reported to not sleep at all, but actually had a rare condition permitting him to sleep only one to two hours per day in the first three years of his life. He had a rare abnormality called an Arnold–Chiari malformation where brain tissue protrudes into the spinal canal and the skull puts pressure on the protruding part of the brain. The boy was operated on at All Children's Hospital in St. Petersburg in May 2008. Two days after surgery he slept through the night.

French sleep expert Michel Jouvet and his team reported the case of a patient who was quasi-sleep-deprived for four months, as confirmed by repeated polygraphic recordings showing less than 30 minutes (of stage-1 sleep) per night, a condition they named "agrypnia". The 27-year-old man had Morvan's fibrillary chorea, a rare disease that leads to involuntary movements, and in this particular case, extreme insomnia. The researchers found that treatment with 5-HTP restored almost normal sleep stages. However some months after this recovery the patient died during a relapse which was unresponsive to 5-HTP. The cause of death was pulmonary edema. Despite the extreme insomnia, psychological investigation showed no sign of cognitive deficits, except for some hallucinations.

Fatal insomnia is a neurodegenerative disease eventually resulting in a complete inability to go past stage 1 of NREM sleep. In addition to insomnia, patients may experience panic attacks, paranoia, phobias, hallucinations, rapid weight loss, and dementia. Death usually occurs between 7 and 36 months from onset.

See also

 Insomnia
 Effects of sleep deprivation on cognitive performance
 Narcolepsy
 Polyphasic sleep
 Sleep medicine
 Sleep onset latency
 Wake therapy
 Tony Wright, who claims to hold the world record for sleep deprivation
 Foreign Correspondent, a 1940 film depicting interrogation by sleep deprivation

References

Sleep medicine
 
Nursing diagnoses
Psychological torture techniques
Physical torture techniques
Disorders causing seizures